The 2019–20 North West Counties Football League season was the 38th in the history of the North West Counties Football League, a football competition in England, and the second season following the split of the lower level into two geographically separated divisions. Teams are divided into three divisions: Premier Division, at Step 5, and Divisions One North and South, at Step 6.

The allocations for Steps 1 to 6 for season 2019–20 were announced by the FA on 19 May. These were subject to appeal, and the North West Counties' constitution was subject to ratification at the league's AGM on 15 June. As one appeal was not yet heard until after the AGM, ratification of the constitution had to be delayed until after the hearing was held. The FA confirmed Carlisle City's transfer to the Northern League at its hearing, thereby rejecting the club's appeal against it and ratifying the constitution.

As three new divisions (one at Step 4 and two at Step 5) were to be introduced to the English football pyramid for the 2020–21 season, at the end of this season three teams were to be promoted from the Premier Division, and four from each Division One.

As a result of the COVID-19 pandemic, this season's competition was formally abandoned on 26 March 2020, with all results from the season being expunged, and no promotion or relegation taking place to, from, or within the competition. On 30 March 2020, sixty-six non-league clubs sent an open letter to the Football Association requesting that they reconsider their decision. Consequently, the addition of three divisions in the football pyramid was fulfilled in 2021–22 instead.

Premier Division

The Premier Division consists of 20 clubs.

The following 4 clubs left the Premier Division before the season -
 Abbey Hey – relegated to Division One South
 City of Liverpool – promoted to the Northern Premier League
 Silsden – transferred to the Northern Counties East League
 West Didsbury & Chorlton – relegated to Division One South

The following 4 clubs joined the Premier Division before the season -
 Avro – promoted from Division One North
 Longridge Town – promoted from Division One North
 Rylands – promoted from Division One South
 Skelmersdale United – relegated from the Northern Premier League

Premier Division table at the time of abandonment

Premier Division Results

† Skelmersdale v Bootle, 29 Feb: match declared void.

Stadia and locations

Division One North

Division One North consists of 20 clubs.

The following 3 clubs left Division One North before the season -
 Avro – promoted to the Premier Division
 Carlisle City – transferred to the Northern League
 Longridge Town – promoted to the  Premier Division

The following 3 clubs joined Division One North before the season -
 Emley – transferred from the Northern Counties East League
 Golcar United – promoted from the West Riding Amateur League
 Pilkington – promoted from the Cheshire League

Division One North table at the time of abandonment
<onlyinclude></onlyinclude>

Division One North Results

Stadia and locations

Division One South

Division One South consists of 20 clubs.

The following 2 clubs left Division One South before the season -
 Rylands – promoted to the Premier Division
 Stone Dominoes – relegated to the Staffordshire County Senior League

The following 2 clubs joined Division One South before the season -
 Abbey Hey – relegated from the Premier Division
 West Didsbury & Chorlton – relegated from the Premier Division

Division One South table at the time of abandonment
<onlyinclude></onlyinclude>

Division One South Results

Stadia and locations

League Challenge Cup
Also called the Macron Challenge Cup for sponsorship reasons.

Sources for this section: fixtures and results

First round

† AFC Darwen fielded ineligible player, and forfeit place in next season's competition.

Second round

<small>* Played at AFC Liverpool's home ground, following postponements
** Played at 1874 Northwich's home ground, following postponements

Third round

<small>* Played at Maine Road's home ground, following postponements

Quarter-finals

Semi-finals

Final
Played on 24 July 2021, at the start of the 2021–22 season.

Division One Trophy
Also called The PlayerMatch.com Cup for sponsorship reasons.

Sources for this section: fixtures and results

First round

All the remaining Division One teams received a bye to the second round.

Second round

Third round

† Eliminated due to playing ineligible player

Quarter-finals

Semi-finals

First leg

Second leg

† AFC Liverpool awarded the tie following the resignation of FC Oswestry Town

Sandbach United won 3–1 on aggregate

Final

The semi-final second leg and the final were played at the start of the 2020–21 season, due to the premature conclusion of the 2019–20 season.

Division One Champions Cup
Not contested this season due to the abandonment of the league programme.

References

External links 
 The Official Website of The North West Counties League

North West Counties Football League seasons
9
North West Counties Football League